Height of Land Township is a township in Becker County, Minnesota, United States. The population was 639 as of the 2000 census.

History
Height of Land Township was organized in 1886. The township is the English translation of an Ojibwe language name for the Height of Land Lake.

Geography

Major highway
  Minnesota State Highway 34

Lakes
 Alvin Lake
 Blackbird Lake
 Booth Lake
 Chippewa Lake (vast majority)
 Evans Lake
 Flat Lake (south half)
 Hanson Lake
 Height Of Land Lake
 High Lake
 Island Lake (west edge)
 Johnson Lake
 Little Toad Lake
 Lake Twentyfive (vast majority)
 Mud Lake
 N Twin Lake
 Pine Lake
 Rice Lake
 S Twin Lake (vast majority)
 Tamarack Lake (east quarter)
 Wetteles Lake

Adjacent townships
 Round Lake Township (northeast)
 Shell Lake Township (east)
 Toad Lake Township (east)
 Evergreen Township (southeast)
 Silver Leaf Township (south)
 Burlington Township (southwest)
 Erie Township (west)
 Holmesville Township (west)
 Sugar Bush Township (northwest)

Cemeteries
The township contains these five cemeteries: Church of the Wildwood, Mennonite, Mount Olive, Saint John's Lutheran and Senjen.

Demographics
As of the census of 2000, there were 639 people, 244 households, and 186 families residing in the township.  The population density was 11.0 people per square mile (4.3/km2).  There were 385 housing units at an average density of 6.6/sq mi (2.6/km2).  The racial makeup of the township was 96.56% White, 1.56% Native American, 0.16% from other races, and 1.72% from two or more races. Hispanic or Latino of any race were 0.31% of the population.

There were 244 households, out of which 28.3% had children under the age of 18 living with them, 70.5% were married couples living together, 4.5% had a female householder with no husband present, and 23.4% were non-families. 18.0% of all households were made up of individuals, and 6.6% had someone living alone who was 65 years of age or older.  The average household size was 2.62 and the average family size was 2.98.

In the township the population was spread out, with 24.3% under the age of 18, 7.8% from 18 to 24, 25.8% from 25 to 44, 32.2% from 45 to 64, and 9.9% who were 65 years of age or older.  The median age was 40 years. For every 100 females, there were 111.6 males.  For every 100 females age 18 and over, there were 107.7 males.

The median income for a household in the township was $36,154, and the median income for a family was $39,500. Males had a median income of $26,071 versus $20,952 for females. The per capita income for the township was $16,973.  About 6.9% of families and 8.1% of the population were below the poverty line, including 1.3% of those under age 18 and 10.7% of those age 65 or over.

References
 United States National Atlas
 United States Census Bureau 2007 TIGER/Line Shapefiles
 United States Board on Geographic Names (GNIS)

Townships in Becker County, Minnesota
Townships in Minnesota